The Edison State Park is located in the Menlo Park section of Edison, New Jersey. It is located on Christie Street, the first street in the world to be lit up by lightbulb, just off Lincoln Highway, near the Metropark Train Station. The park commemorates the site where the famous inventor Thomas Alva Edison had his Menlo Park laboratory. In his laboratory, Edison invented over 600 inventions such as the incandescent electric light and the  phonograph, the latter being the first object to record and play sound.

History
The research and development laboratory in Menlo Park was the first of its kind in the world. On October 22, 1879, Thomas Edison tested a bamboo filament which lasted over 30 hours, which was used to create the first successful incandescent light bulb. This accomplishment followed Edison's testing of over a thousand filaments in six months. Three years earlier, Thomas Edison tested his wax and tinfoil phonograph by recording and playing "Mary Had a Little Lamb." Thomas Edison improved Alexander Graham Bell's telephone using carbon. In addition, he invented an electric train and tested it on a track built around his laboratory, now coinciding with modern day Christie Street and Route 27.

In 1887, when Thomas Edison needed a bigger laboratory closer to New York City, he moved his research laboratory to West Orange, New Jersey. Most of the buildings either burned down or collapsed, and the two surviving buildings, the glass shed and the Sarah Jordan Boarding House were moved by Henry Ford in 1929 to Greenfield Village in Dearborn, Michigan, now part of The Henry Ford museum. The remaining structure from the other buildings was used by Henry Ford to rebuild them in Greenfield Village, where they are still open today. Despite the fact that Edison's laboratory had fully been relocated, on May 16, 1925, John Leib, vice president of the New York Edison Company, dedicated a stone tablet and memorial at the intersection of Christie Street and Route 27 (Lincoln Highway), a gift from the State of New Jersey, with Edison, his wife Edison, and Governor George S. Silzer attending the event. On May 17, 1937, construction began on a new monument to Edison, the Edison Tower.

A small, two room museum houses a collection of Edison memorabilia such as historic light bulbs, phonographs, dynamos and portions of Edison's electric train test track. Tours are available for free, although the Edison Tower Memorial Corporation recommends visitors to donate at least $5.00 per person. The tower was closed in 1992 after slabs of concrete started falling from the 54-year-old freestanding structure. After it was put on the list of New Jersey's most endangered historic sites in 1997, the Edison Township Memorial Corporation started a $3.87 million renovation. On October 24, 2015, the end of the restoration was marked by a rededication ceremony which included the relighting of the tower. Plans were also announced to build a new, larger museum featuring artifact exhibits and interactive activities. Surrounding the two historic acres is a small forest with a couple of trails. The forest features a small pond, a meadow, and several ravines which are visible from the trail. On Christie Street, the world's first street lit by electric lights, there are several informative boards describing Menlo Park in the Edison Era.

See also 

 Thomas Alva Edison Memorial Tower and Museum
 Thomas Edison National Historical Park

References

Inline citations

General references
http://www.menloparkmuseum.org/thomas-edison-and-menlo-park. Thomas Edison and Menlo Park, July 1, 2013.
http://www.thehenryford.org/village/historicdistricts.aspx. Edison at Work, July 1, 2013.
https://web.archive.org/web/20130531034607/http://www.menloparkmuseum.org/new-museum. New Museum, July 3, 2013.
https://web.archive.org/web/20160201032330/http://www.preservationnj.org/site/ExpEng/index.php?%2Ften_most_12%2Farchive_by_city_detail%2F1997%2FThomas_Edison_Memorial_Tower. Thomas Edison Memorial Tower, July 3, 2013.
https://web.archive.org/web/20131007102132/http://menloparkmuseum.org/rejuvenated-edison-state-park. Rejuvenated Edison State Park, July 4, 2013
Carlson, Laurie. Thomas Edison: His Life and Ideas. Chicago: Chicago Review Press, Incorporated, 2006.
Makin, Bob. "Edison Memorial Tower Rededicated." MY CENTRAL JERSEY. MyCentralJersey.com, 25 Oct. 2015. Web. 11 Oct. 2016.

Thomas Edison
Edison, New Jersey